Lionel Tan Han Wei (陈汉玮, born 5 June 1997) is a Singaporean professional footballer who plays as a centre-back for Singapore Premier League club Lion City Sailors.

He was with the National Football Academy after graduating from Singapore Sports School. In 2016, he started his career with Home United's Prime League team. Subsequently, in 2017, he moved to Hougang United.

His performance at the youth level led to him being nominated for the 2014 Dollah Kassim Award although he did not win it in the end.

Club career

NFA U18

Tan started his career with National Football Academy (NFA) U-18 team in 2015 after his graduation from the Singapore Sports School. He had hoped to move on to the Garena Young Lions squad following his exploits with the NFA. However, when no such move arose, Tan jumped at the chance to be reunited with Robin Chitrakar at Home United's Prime League squad.

Home United
Tan moved to the Protectors in 2016 and was made the vice captain of the prime league squad.

During his time with the Protectors' Prime League squad, he helped them achieve a double, winning the Prime League and the Singapore FA Cup.

He then made his senior debut on 14 July 2016 against Albirex Niigata Singapore in the Singapore League Cup. He made a total of two senior appearances for the Protectors before moving on the next season.

Hougang United
Tan then moved to Hougang United for the 2017 S.League season. He made his debut for the Cheetahs against Tampines Rovers, coming on as a substitute in the 61st minute before earning a shock first start in the following match against Brunei DPMM in a 2–0 defeat.

Young Lions

After spending one year with SAFSA, he moved to Garena Young Lions for the 2019 season for whom he made a total of 19 league appearances.

Back to Hougang United 
Lionel returned to Hougang after the completion of his National Service in the middle of the 2020 Singapore Premier League season. He scored the first professional goal of his career in the third match of the 2021 Singapore Premier League season, sweeping in a loose ball and helping his team to a shock 3-1 win against powerhouse Lion City Sailors.

International career
He was part of the 2015 Under-18 Squad for AFC Under-19 Championship qualifiers.

He is also in the 2016 AFC Under-19 Championship qualifiers playing in matches against Thailand which the team lost 3–0.  He also played against Chinese Taipei.

In 2017, Lionel was called up to the Singapore Under-22 squad for the 2017 Southeast Asian Games but failed to make a single appearance as the Republic crashed out in the group stages.

He captained the Singapore Under-22 squad for the 2019 Southeast Asian Games.

Career statistics

Club

International

U23 International goals

U23 International caps
 Result column lists Singapore U22 score first.

U19 International caps
 Result column lists Singapore U19 score first.

Honours

Club 
Home United
 Prime League: 2016
 Singapore FA Cup: 2016

International 
Singapore U22
 Merlion Cup: 2019

References

1997 births
Living people
Singaporean footballers
Singaporean sportspeople of Chinese descent
Singapore Premier League players
Home United FC players
Hougang United FC players
Association football defenders
Competitors at the 2017 Southeast Asian Games
Competitors at the 2019 Southeast Asian Games
Southeast Asian Games competitors for Singapore